The Brooklyn Celtics were an American basketball team based in Brooklyn, New York that was a member of the American Basketball League.

During the first half of the 1940/41 season, the Troy Celtics moved to Brooklyn to become the Brooklyn Celtics.

Year-by-year

Basketball teams in New York City
Sports in Brooklyn